Kakanakote is situated at a distance of 73 km from Mysore in Karnataka state, India. It is a thick forest of the Western Ghats, and a famous place where a large number of wild elephants can be found. Now it is a wildlife national park, monitored and regulated by the state.

Origin of Name 

This is the famous forest range named after the legendary Kaka Nayaka, who was the leader of the local forest dwelling Kuruba people. Impressed by Kaka Nayaka's bravery and with the then maharaja of Mysore named the forest after him.

Facilities 
Periodically herds of elephants were once captured at this place by the Khedda method. Facilities for wild life viewing are available in this national park.

Play 
It is also made famous by the play of the same name by Maasti Venkatesh Ayengar

External links 
 Contacts
 Movie

Forests of India